The Chamaeleon complex is a large star forming region (SFR) at the surface of the Local Bubble that includes the Chamaeleon I, Chamaeleon II, and Chamaeleon III dark clouds. It occupies nearly all of the constellation Chamaeleon and overlaps into Apus, Musca, Carina and Octans. The mean density of X-ray sources is about one source per square degree.

Chamaeleon I dark cloud

The Chamaeleon I (Cha I) cloud is one of the nearest active star formation regions at ~160 pc. It is relatively isolated from other star-forming clouds, so it is unlikely that older pre-main sequence (PMS) stars have drifted into the field. The total stellar population is 200–300. The Cha I cloud is further divided into the North cloud or region and South cloud or main cloud.

HD 97300 emits X-rays, illuminates the reflection nebula IC 2631 and is one of the highest mass members of the Cha I cloud, spectral type B9V, a Herbig Ae/Be star without emission lines.

Cha Halpha 1 is an object of spectral type M8 in the Chamaeleon I dark cloud that was determined in 1998 to be an X-ray source and as such is the first X-ray emitting brown dwarf found.

There are some seventy to ninety X-ray sources in the Chamaeleon I star forming region. The Uhuru X-ray source (4U 1119–77) is within the Chamaeleon I cloud. This source region within the Chamaeleon I dark cloud was observed by ROSAT on February 9 at 22:14:47 UTC to February 18, 1991, 17:59:12 UTC, and on March 6, 1991, from 09:12:19 to 13:05:13 UTC. This cloud contains both "weak" T Tauri (WTT) stars and "classical" T Tauri (CTT) stars. Chamaeleon I X-ray ROSAT source 66 is at RA 11h 17m 36.4-37.9s Dec -77° 04' 27-50", is a CTT, Chamaeleon I No. T56, aka CTT star HM 32.

The Chamaeleon I dark cloud was observed with the Imaging Proportional Counter (IPC) on board the Einstein Observatory for 2.5 h on January 23–24, 1981, identifying some 22 X-ray sources. None of these sources was closer than 8' to 4U 1119–77.

Chamaeleon II dark cloud

Chamaeleon II contains the Uhuru source 4U 1302–77. It is close to RXJ 1303.1-7706 at RA 13h 03m 04.70s Dec -77° 06' 55.0", a K7-M0 new WTT. The Chamaeleon II dark cloud contains some 40 X-ray sources. Observation in Chamaeleon II was carried out from September 10 to 17, 1993. Source RXJ 1301.9-7706, a new WTTS candidate of spectral type K1, is closest to 4U 1302–77.

Chamaeleon III dark cloud

"Chamaeleon III appears to be devoid of current star-formation activity." There are two particularly prominent nebulae associated with this area. The smaller is commonly known as the Thumbprint Nebula and the larger The Talon Nebula.

Extended definition
The cloud is sometimes extended with an eastern part, and together with the distinctively long Dark Doodad Nebula (or Musca nebula) to the north the complex is called the Musca-Chamaeleonis Molecular Cloud.

See also
Corona Australis Molecular Cloud

References

Star-forming regions